Lyman Rufus Casey Jr. (May 6, 1837January 26, 1914) was a United States senator from North Dakota.

Early life 
On May 6, 1837, Casey was born as Lyman Rufus Casey Jr. in York, New York.
In 1853, Casey moved with his parents to Ypsilanti, Michigan. Casey received a classical education.

Career 
Casey engaged in the hardware business for many years; in 1882, he moved to Carrington, Foster County, Territory of Dakota, and became a rancher. He was chairman of the North Dakota Committee on Irrigation and was commissioner of Foster County in 1887.

Upon the admission of North Dakota as a State into the Union, Casey was elected as a Republican to the U.S. Senate and served from November 25, 1889, to March 4, 1893. He was an unsuccessful candidate for renomination in 1892. While in the Senate, he was chairman of the Committee on Railroads (Fifty-second Congress). He moved to New York City.

Personal life 
In 1861, Casey married Harriett Mary Platt. One of her siblings was Jane Platt, wife of the drinking straw inventor Marvin C. Stone.

Casey returned to Washington, D.C. He died there on January 25, 1914.

Casey is buried at Greenmount Cemetery in Baltimore, Maryland.

References 

1837 births
1914 deaths
Politicians from Ypsilanti, Michigan
Republican Party United States senators from North Dakota
North Dakota Republicans
People from York, New York
19th-century American politicians